Darton may refer to:

 Darton, a large village in South Yorkshire, England, near Barnsley
 Darton railway station
 Darton College, Darton
 Darton Primary School
 Darton (surname)
 Darton State College, Georgia, U.S.

See also
 Darton College (disambiguation)